Aglaja Schmid (1926–2003) was an Austrian stage and film actress. She was married to the theatre and film director Rudolf Steinboeck.

Selected filmography
 The Other Life (1948)
 The Trial (1948)
 Dreaming Days (1951)
 My Name is Niki (1952)
 Franz Schubert (1953)
 Daughter of the Regiment (1953)

References

Bibliography

External links

1926 births
2003 deaths
Austrian film actresses